syn-Propanethial S-oxide (or (Z)-propanethial S-oxide), a member of a class of organosulfur compounds known as thiocarbonyl S-oxides (formerly "sulfines"), is a volatile liquid that acts as a lachrymatory agent (triggers tearing and stinging on contact with the eyes). The chemical is released from onions, Allium cepa, as they are sliced. The release is due to the breaking open of the onion cells and their releasing enzymes called alliinases, which then break down amino acid sulfoxides, generating sulfenic acids. A specific sulfenic acid, 1-propenesulfenic acid, formed when onions are cut, is rapidly rearranged by a second enzyme, called the lachrymatory factor synthase or LFS, giving syn-propanethial S-oxide. The gas diffuses through the air and, on contact with the eye, it stimulates sensory neurons creating a stinging, painful sensation.  Tears are released from the tear glands to dilute and flush out the irritant. A structurally related lachrymatory compound, syn-butanethial S-oxide, C4H8OS, has been found in another genus Allium plant, Allium siculum.

See also
 Allicin

References

Organosulfur compounds
Lachrymatory agents
Pungent flavors
Onions
Sulfoxides